Marco Antonio Ameglio Samudio (b. 1961) is a Panamanian politician and businessman. 

He served as the President of the National Assembly from 1991 to 1992. Ameglio has been on the Panama Canal Authority Board of Directors since March 23, 2010. He was sworn for a period of 9 years.

References

Panamanian politicians
Living people
1961 births
Panameñista Party politicians
Presidents of the National Assembly (Panama)